Udo Birnbaum (born 8 February 1937) is an Austrian modern pentathlete and fencer. He competed at the 1960, 1964 and 1968 Summer Olympics. His son, Axel Birnbaum, fenced at the 1988 Summer Olympics.

References

External links
 

1937 births
Living people
Austrian male fencers
Austrian épée fencers
Austrian male modern pentathletes
Olympic fencers of Austria
Olympic modern pentathletes of Austria
Fencers at the 1964 Summer Olympics
Fencers at the 1968 Summer Olympics
Modern pentathletes at the 1960 Summer Olympics
Modern pentathletes at the 1964 Summer Olympics
Sportspeople from Lower Austria